Pequeñas coincidencias is a Spanish romantic comedy television series created by Javier Veiga starring Marta Hazas and Veiga himself. Its three seasons were released on Amazon Prime Video between 2018 and 2021.

Premise 
The fiction focuses on the ups and downs of the relationship between Javi (Javier Veiga) and Marta (Marta Hazas).

Cast 
 Marta Hazas as Marta Valdivia.
  as Javier Rubirosa.
 Mariano Peña as Joaquín.
  as Nacho.
 Alicia Rubio as Elisa.
 Marta Castellote as Carla.
 Alosian Vivancos as Diego.
 Juan López-Tagle as Giovanni.
 Lucía Balas as Niña.
 Álvaro Balas as Niño.
 Unax Ugalde as Mario.
  as Rafa.
 Tomás Pozzi as David.
 José Troncoso as Josemi.

Production and release 
Created by Javier Veiga, the series was produced by Amazon Prime Video together with Atresmedia Studio, Onza Entertainment and MedioLimón. Together with Veiga, the scripwriting team of the first season was formed by Marta G. De Vega, Abraham Sastre, María Miranda, Germán Aparicio, Alonso Laporta, Daniel Monedero, Jorge López, Gerald Fillmore and Cristina Pons. It was shot on location in Madrid. Veiga, Mario Montero and Miguel Conde directed the episodes of the first season.
The first season of Pequeñas coincidencias, consisting of 8 episodes featuring a running time of around 50 minutes, premiered on 7 December 2018 on Amazon Prime Video. The series began its free-to-air broadcasting run on Antena 3 on 2 September 2019. Amazon Prime Video simultaneously released the second season in Spain, Latin America and the United States on 15 January 2020. It consisted of 12 episodes with a running time of 25–30minutes. Comprising 10 episodes, the third and final season was released on 5 February 2021 on Prime Video. NBC purchased the rights to produce an American remake, tentatively titled Someone Out There, whose production was put in hold by the COVID-19 pandemic.

Awards and nominations 

|-
| align = "center" | 2019 || colspan = "2" | 7th  || Best Comedy Series ||  || 
|-
| align = "center" | 2021? || 23th Iris Awards || Best Actor || Javier Veiga ||  || 
|}

References 

Television shows filmed in Spain
2010s Spanish comedy television series
2020s Spanish comedy television series
2010s romantic comedy television series
2020s romantic comedy television series
2018 Spanish television series debuts
2021 Spanish television series endings
Spanish-language television shows
Spanish-language Amazon Prime Video original programming
Television series by Onza